Paul Julian may refer to:
Paul Julian (artist) (1914–1995), American artist and designer
Paul Julian (meteorologist) (born 1929), American meteorologist

See also